Flying Enterprise may refer to:
 SS Flying Enterprise, American ship sunk in 1952
 Flying Enterprise (airline), defunct Danish airline